Mohammad Shahrar Ali, known as Shahrar Ali , is a British politician and academic who served as deputy leader of the Green Party of England and Wales from 2014 to 2016. He was the first ethnic minority deputy leader of a party with representation in parliament in the UK.

He stood for election to be leader of the Green Party in 2018, 2020 and 2021. His public statements on sex and gender and appointment in 2021 as the party's policing and domestic safety spokesperson were believed to be reasons for the party's co-leader Siân Berry stepping down.

In February 2022, Ali launched legal action against the Green Party alleging discrimination of gender-critical beliefs under the 2010 Equality Act. He was subsequently removed from his position as a party spokesperson for alleged breaches of the Speakers’ Code of Conduct.

Education and career
Shahrar Ali has degrees in biochemical engineering (BEng) and philosophy (BA, MPhil, PhD) from the University of London. His 1997 MPhil thesis was on "Practical reason with reference to the Human conception", and his 2004 PhD thesis (UCL) was entitled "Making as if to stand behind one's words: a theory of intentional deception and lying". His research interests are in moral and applied philosophy.

Before entering politics, Ali worked as a European Parliament researcher. He works in the Institute of Health Sciences Education at Queen Mary, University of London.

Political career

Early candidacies (2004–2014) 
Shahrar Ali stood as a Green Party list candidate for the European Parliament in 2004, 2009 and 2014. He stood as the Green Party candidate for Brent East in the 2005 general election, winning 2.9% of the vote. He was a London Assembly candidate both in Brent and Harrow and in the London-wide list in 2008 and 2012, and stood for Parliamentary election for Brent Central in 2005 and 2010. Ali unsuccessfully sought his party's nomination to be a candidate for the 2008 and 2012 London mayoral elections.

He ran for election to Brent London Borough Council six times from 2005 to 2014, and once for Camden London Borough Council in 2006. In 2009, he successfully campaigned to stop Asda delivery lorries blocking a pavement. He wrote Why Vote Green in 2010.

Deputy leader (2014–2016) 
Ali ran for election to be deputy leader of the Green Party in the 2014 Green Party of England and Wales leadership election. The party's rules meant that two deputy leaders were elected, who needed to be different genders. Amelia Womack was elected first, and Ali was elected second after beating the incumbent, Will Duckworth, and two other male candidates.

In January 2015, Ali released a statement with the party's leader Natalie Bennett and his co-deputy Amelia Womack condemning the Parliamentary candidate for Cambridge, Rupert Read. Read had said that trans women were "a sort of 'opt-in' version of what it means to be a woman" among other remarks about trans people which he later apologised for. For the 2015 election, Ali edited Why Vote Green 2015. He was the party's Parliamentary candidate in Brent Central and Bethnal Green and Bow. In November 2015, Ali was selected to be the third candidate on the Green Party's London-wide list for the 2016 London Assembly election. He was speculated as a potential candidate for the 2016 Green Party leadership election and told The Guardian he might stand. He ended up running for re-election as deputy leader, losing his position and coming in third place.

Other roles (2016–2018) 
In August 2016, Ali joined a march in London calling for slavery reparations. Between 2017 and 2020, Ali served as home affairs spokesperson for the Green Party. He released a statement opposing Cressida Dick's appointment as Commissioner of the Metropolitan Police.

Holocaust Memorial Day comments 
In August 2018, in an article published on the Left Foot Forward blog, the Campaign Against Antisemitism described a speech Ali had made nine years earlier as antisemitic and an "offensive rant". He was accused of comparing Israel's treatment of Palestinians to the Holocaust by saying "just because you observe the niceties of Holocaust Memorial Day, it does not mean you have learned the lessons of history". Ali described the accusation as a "gross fabrication", telling the Evening Standard that it was "designed to stifle legitimate criticism of the Israeli government". The claims against Ali were also reported in The Jewish Chronicle and in October 2020, IPSO upheld a complaint against The Jewish Chronicle as the publication did not make clear that "compared one of Israel’s 2009 offensive on Gaza to the Shoah" was their characterisation of Ali's comments rather than a factual description of them and that it had assumed Ali had made the remarks on Holocaust Memorial Day.

The Green Party said that its initial handling of reports about Ali's speech in 2009 were inadequate and that it is seeking to revise procedures. The Green Party later clarified that no formal complaint of antisemitism was received and condemned "the way in which the statements provided were used to fuel further stories and negative comment".

Leadership campaigns (2018–present) 
On 29 June 2018, Ali announced he would stand in the 2018 Green Party of England and Wales leadership election. He was considered the main challenger to the co-leadership ticket of Jonathan Bartley and Siân Berry. Bartley and Berry won with 6,239 votes, whilst Ali came in second place with 1,466 votes and 17.5% of the vote.

In September 2018, Ali called for an investigation into the suspension of a member who was suspended for saying that allowing trans children to transition was child abuse. In October of the same year, he spoke at the Green Party's conference to oppose adoption of the Working Definition of Antisemitism. In 2019, Ali was a list candidate for the 2019 European Parliament election. In June 2020, Ali announced his candidacy in the 2020 Green Party of England and Wales leadership election. In September 2020, it was announced that Ali had lost the election to incumbent co-leaders Siân Berry and Jonathan Bartley. Ali published a statement during his 2020 leadership campaign titled "What is a Woman?", which stated "A woman is commonly defined as an adult human female and, genetically, typified by two XX chromosomes. These facts are not in dispute nor should they be in any political party." This was criticised by Benali Hamdache as excluding both trans women and intersex women from womanhood. Ali came third in the election, receiving 23.6% of the vote.

In February 2021, Ali proposed a motion opposing the Working Definition of Antisemitism, which he called "counterproductive on its own terms and inimical to free speech on the Israel-Palestine conflict". He was a list candidate for the party in the 2021 London Assembly election and unsuccessfully sought the party's nomination for the 2021 London mayoral election. In June 2021, Ali was appointed as the Green Party's spokesperson for policing and domestic safety. His appointment was seen as controversial in the party due to previous allegations against him of transphobia. A member of one of the party's policy working groups resigned due to Ali's appointment. Green Party members, according to PoliticsHome, said this was the main reason for Siân Berry's July 2021 decision not to stand in the next party leader election. In her statement, Berry cited unspecified spokesperson appointments as being inconsistent with her pledge to support trans equality. In July, the Young Greens of England and Wales passed a motion calling for Ali's appointment to be ended.

In August 2021, Ali announced his candidacy in the 2021 Green Party of England and Wales leadership election. He came third and was eliminated in the first round after receiving 21.0% of the vote. In February 2022, Ali was removed from his position as the Green Party's spokesperson for policing and domestic safety. Liz Reason, chair of the Green Party's executive, announced on Twitter that "the Green Party Executive has removed Shahrar Ali from his role as party spokesperson for breaches of the Speakers' Code of Conduct."

Elections contested

Public office

European Parliament

House of Commons

London Assembly (constituency)

London Assembly (list)

Council

Green Party

Leader

Deputy leader

References

Living people
British Muslims
Alumni of the University of London
British politicians of Pakistani descent
Green Party of England and Wales parliamentary candidates
People associated with Queen Mary University of London
Year of birth missing (living people)
Transphobia in the United Kingdom